Geki is Japanese for "strike" and may refer to:

A male shaman
Geki (driver) (1937–1967), pseudonym of Giacomo Russo, an Italian race car driver
Juken Sentai Gekiranger, a Japanese television program
Geki, a fictional ninja in Street Fighter arcade games
Geki/Tyranno Ranger, a fictional character in Kyōryū Sentai Zyuranger tokusatsu television series
Bear Geki, a character in Saint Seiya 

ro:Geki